Madison/Wells was a station on the Chicago Transit Authority's Loop. The station was located at 1 North Wells Street in the Chicago Loop. Madison/Wells opened on October 3, 1897, and closed on January 30, 1994, and demolished so that work on the new Washington/Wells station could begin. This station and Randolph/Wells were replaced by Washington/Wells. The station was located at Madison Street and Wells Street in the Chicago Loop.

References

External links 

Defunct Chicago "L" stations
Railway stations in the United States opened in 1897
Railway stations closed in 1994
1897 establishments in Illinois
1994 disestablishments in Illinois
Former North Shore Line stations